Chapelton is a hamlet in Devon. It is located in the civil parish of Tawstock. The hamlet is served by the Chapelton railway station.

References

Hamlets in Devon
North Devon